There are several notable people with the name Legnani including:

Antonio Legnani (1888-1943) — an Italian admiral who took part in both world wars
Luigi Legnani (1790-1877) — an Italian guitarist and composer
Pierina Legnani (1863-1923) — an Italian and the first prima ballerina assoluta
Stefano Maria Legnani (1660–1715) — an Italian painter of the Baroque period, also called Legnanino to distinguish him from his father